Hindu Religious Welfare Trust is a national government trust that looks after the welfare of the Hindu community of Bangladesh and is located in Dhaka, Bangladesh.

History
The Hindu Religious Welfare Trust was established in 1983. It is under the Ministry of Religious Affairs. In 2016-2017 budget session 2 billion taka was allocated to the trust by the finance ministry.

References

Government agencies of Bangladesh
Organisations based in Dhaka
1983 establishments in Bangladesh
Hinduism in Bangladesh